Ronaël Julien Pierre-Gabriel (born 13 June 1998) is a French professional footballer of Martinican and Malagasy descent who plays as a defender for Spanish club Espanyol, on loan from the German club Mainz 05.

Club career
Pierre-Gabriel is a youth exponent from Saint-Étienne. He made his Ligue 1 debut on 29 November 2015 against Guingamp. He started in the first eleven, before being substituted after 61 minutes for Pierre-Yves Polomat.

On 23 July 2022, Pierre-Gabriel joined Ligue 1 side Strasbourg on a season-long loan with an option-to-buy. On 18 January 2023, he moved on a new loan until the end of the season to Espanyol in Spain.

Career statistics

References

External links
 France profile at FFF
 Saint-Étienne profile

1998 births
Footballers from Paris
Living people
French footballers
France under-21 international footballers
France youth international footballers
Association football defenders
Ligue 1 players
Championnat National 2 players
Bundesliga players
La Liga players
AS Saint-Étienne players
AS Monaco FC players
1. FSV Mainz 05 players
Stade Brestois 29 players
RC Strasbourg Alsace players
RCD Espanyol footballers
French expatriate footballers
Expatriate footballers in Monaco
French expatriate sportspeople in Monaco
Expatriate footballers in Germany
French expatriate sportspeople in Germany
Expatriate footballers in Spain
French expatriate sportspeople in Spain